Anostoma rossi is a species of air-breathing land snail, a terrestrial pulmonate gastropod mollusc in the family Odontostomidae.

Distribution
This species occurs in Brazil.

References

Odontostomidae
Gastropods described in 1925